The 1922 FA Cup final was contested by Huddersfield Town and Preston North End at Stamford Bridge. Huddersfield won by a single goal, a penalty scored by Billy Smith.

Overview

This was the last final before the opening of Wembley Stadium, and was also Huddersfield's first and only FA Cup triumph. Preston goalkeeper James Mitchell was the first (and only) player ever to wear spectacles in an FA Cup Final.

This was the first final to be decided by a penalty kick and the award of it was controversial, confirmed by newsreel footage, that the foul had occurred outside the penalty area.

Match details

Road to Stamford Bridge

Huddersfield Town

Preston North End

References

External links
FA Cup Final lineups

FA Cup Finals
Final
FA Cup Final
FA Cup Final 1922
FA Cup Final 1922
FA Cup
FA Cup Final
FA Cup Final